Derek Robert Alexander Emslie, Lord Kingarth (born 21 June 1949) is a judge of the Supreme Courts of Scotland, sitting in the High Court of Justiciary and the Inner House of the Court of Session. He is the son of former Lord President George Emslie, Baron Emslie, and younger brother of fellow judge Nigel Emslie, Lord Emslie.

Early life
Emslie was educated at the Edinburgh Academy and Trinity College, Glenalmond, before studying at Gonville and Caius College, Cambridge (BA) and the School of Law of the University of Edinburgh (LLB). He was admitted to Faculty of Advocates in 1974, becoming a Queen's Counsel in 1987. As a young man he was a keen sportsman, playing scrum-half for Edinburgh Wanderers and midfield for Spartans F.C. During a game between Oxford and Cambridge University football clubs at Wembley Stadium, Emslie's was the first name ever displayed on the new electronic scoreboard.

Legal career
He served from 1979 to 1987 as Standing Junior Counsel (legal advisor appointed by the Lord Advocate) to the Department of Health and Social Security, and from 1985 to 1988 as an Advocate Depute, representing the Crown in prosecutions and appeals in the High Court. From 1988 to 1995, he was a part-time Chairman of the Pension Appeal Tribunal, and from 1990 the Medical Appeal Tribunal. He was elected Vice-Dean of the Faculty of Advocates in 1995, holding this post until 1997, at which time his brother was elected Dean of the Faculty.

In 1997, he was appointed a Senator of the College of Justice, a judge of the Court of Session and High Court of Justiciary, Scotland's Supreme Courts, with the judicial title, Lord Kingarth. He was promoted to the Inner House of the Court of Session in 2005, at which time he was appointed to the Privy Council.

Personal life
Emslie married Elizabeth Carstairs in 1974, with whom he has a son and two daughters.

See also
List of Senators of the College of Justice

References

Living people
1949 births
Kingarth
People educated at Glenalmond College
Alumni of Gonville and Caius College, Cambridge
People educated at Edinburgh Academy
Alumni of the University of Edinburgh
Members of the Faculty of Advocates
Members of the Privy Council of the United Kingdom
Sons of life peers